Thomas Barnard Flint (April 28, 1847 – April 8, 1919) was a Canadian lawyer and political figure in Nova Scotia. He represented Yarmouth in the House of Commons of Canada from 1891 to 1902 as a Liberal member.

Early life and education
He was born in Yarmouth, Nova Scotia, the son of John Flint and Anne Barnard, and was educated at the Wesleyan Academy in Sackville, New Brunswick and Harvard University. He married Mary Ella Dane.

Career
He was called to the bar in 1872 and set up practice in Yarmouth. In 1874, Flint married Mary E. Dane. He was high sheriff for Yarmouth County from 1883 to 1886.

Political career
Flint was assistant clerk for the Nova Scotia House of Assembly from 1887 to 1891. He ran unsuccessfully for a seat in the provincial assembly in 1873 and 1882 and ran unsuccessfully for a seat in the House of Commons in 1878. In 1902, Flint was named Clerk of the House of Commons and resigned his seat. He served in that post until 1918. He died the following year in Yarmouth at the age of 71.

He was editor of Bourinot's Parliamentary Practice and Procedure, 3rd edition, published in 1903.

References 

1847 births
1919 deaths
Harvard University alumni
Liberal Party of Canada MPs
Members of the House of Commons of Canada from Nova Scotia
People from Yarmouth, Nova Scotia
Clerks of the House of Commons (Canada)
Mount Allison University alumni